Far West was a settlement of the Latter Day Saint movement in Caldwell County, Missouri, United States, during the late 1830s. It is recognized as a historic site by the U.S. National Register of Historic Places, added to the register in 1970. It is owned and maintained by the Church of Jesus Christ of Latter-day Saints.

Foundation and early history
The town was founded by Missouri leaders of the church, W. W. Phelps and John Whitmer in August 1836 shortly before the county's creation. The town was platted originally as a  square area, centered on a public square which was to house a temple. The design of the town resembled the plan of Joseph Smith Jr. (the first modern-day prophet of the Latter Day Saint Movement) for the City of Zion, which had been planned to be built in the town of Independence, Missouri.

Early Latter-day Saints began to settle in northwestern Missouri soon after the church was organized in 1830. According to a revelation given by Joseph Smith Jr., Independence would be the "centerplace" of the City of Zion when Jesus returned. However, disputes between early members of the church and Missourian settlers in Independence led to the expulsion of the early members of the church from Jackson County in 1833. Most temporarily settled in Clay County, Missouri. Towards the end of 1836, Caldwell County was created specifically for a settlement of members of the church to compensate property losses in Jackson County. Shortly after the creation of Caldwell County, Far West was made the county seat.

Far West became the headquarters of the church in early 1838 when Joseph Smith and Sidney Rigdon relocated to the town from the previous church headquarters in Kirtland, Ohio. Joseph Smith taught that the Garden of Eden had been in Jackson County and when Adam and Eve were expelled from the Garden, they moved to the area now comprising Caldwell and Daviess Counties, Missouri. While headquartered in Far West, the official name of the church was changed to The Church of Jesus Christ of Latter Day Saints, after previously being known as the Church of Christ from 1830 to 1834 and as the Church of the Latter Day Saints, and variations of that name, since 1834.

Missourian conflict of 1838

New problems erupted when members of the church began to settle in the counties surrounding Caldwell, including De Witt in Carroll County and Adam-ondi-Ahman in Daviess County. Fear that the growing number of Saints would outnumber the local citizens, and misunderstandings regarding the doctrine, purposes, and practices of the church, created a series of escalating conflicts,  and the Governor of Missouri eventually called out 2,500 state militiamen to put down what he alleged to be a "Mormon rebellion." He also issued an extermination order to rid the state of the church. Terrified, members of the church poured into Far West for protection and found themselves under siege. Joseph Smith Jr., Sidney Rigdon, and others surrendered at the end of October 1838, hoping to alleviate the persecution on the main church body of members, but were put on trial by the state for treason on trumped up false charges. The main body of the church was then forced illegally to sign over their property in Far West and Caldwell County to pay for the militia muster and then leave the state. The main body later settled in Nauvoo, Illinois.

Aftermath and Far West today
Far West became a ghost town soon after the departure of most of the church population. The county seat was moved to Kingston, Missouri and many of the log houses in Far West were relocated. John Whitmer continued to live in the nearly empty town, where he owned a large farm.

The Church of Jesus Christ of Latter-day Saints purchased the temple site and some of the surrounding area in 1909. Since then, Far West has been maintained as a historic site. The church also honors the Far West legacy in the name of a ward located in Cameron and, since 2015, a stake centered in Gallatin.

Community of Christ, formerly known as the Reorganized Church of Jesus Christ of Latter Day Saints, has a congregation that meets in Far West, across the street from the historic site.

In 2004 construction began on a historic village adjacent to the temple site. It is operated by the Far West Historical Society to accommodate and increase tourism. The Country Store has been in operation since 2006.

In May 2012, The Church of Jesus Christ of Latter-day Saints confirmed that it purchased  of Missouri farmland and three historical sites from Community of Christ, including land around Far West.

References

Stephen C. LeSueur, The 1838 Mormon War in Missouri, University of Missouri Press, 1990.
Alexander L. Baugh, A Call to Arms: The 1838 Mormon Defense of Northern Missouri, BYU Studies, 2000.
John Hamer, Northeast of Eden: A Historical Atlas of Missouri's Mormon County, Far West Cultural Center, 2004.

External links

https://web.archive.org/web/20070627162626/http://www.farwesthistorical.org/
Plan of Far West
Far West Temple Site at ChurchofJesusChristTemples.org

Caldwell County, Missouri
1838 Mormon War
Former populated places in Caldwell County, Missouri
Latter Day Saint movement in Missouri
Mormonism-related controversies
Populated places established in 1836
Significant places in Mormonism
The Church of Jesus Christ of Latter-day Saints in Missouri
Buildings and structures in Caldwell County, Missouri
Tourist attractions in Caldwell County, Missouri
Properties of religious function on the National Register of Historic Places in Missouri
National Register of Historic Places in Caldwell County, Missouri
1836 establishments in Missouri
Former populated places in Missouri